The 1914 New Hampshire gubernatorial election was held on November 3, 1914. Republican nominee Rolland H. Spaulding defeated Democratic nominee Albert W. Noone with 55.18% of the vote.

Primary elections
Primary elections were held on September 1, 1914.

Democratic primary

Candidates
Albert W. Noone
John C. Hutchins

Results

Republican primary

Candidates
Rolland H. Spaulding, businessman
Rosecrans W. Pillsbury

Results

General election

Candidates
Major party candidates
Rolland H. Spaulding, Republican
Albert W. Noone, Democratic

Other candidates
Henry D. Allison, Progressive
John P. Burke, Socialist

Results

References

1914
New Hampshire
Gubernatorial